Gabriel Minadeo Ramírez (born July 27, 1967) is a male former field hockey player from Argentina. He competed for his native country at three consecutive Summer Olympics (1988, 1992, 1996).

At his last appearance (1996) Minadeo finished in eighth place with the Argentina men's national field hockey team. Later, he became an assistant in the staff guided by Sergio Vigil during all of his period as coach of the Argentina women's national field hockey team. In 2005 he was appointed coach himself after Vigil resigned.

Minadeo coached Las Leonas to bronze medals at the 2008 Summer Olympics and at the 2006 World Cup. Under his guidance, the national squad also won the gold medal at the 2008 Champions Trophy, silver medal at the 2007 Champions Trophy, the gold medal at the 2007 Pan American Games and at the 2009 Pan American Cup.

In 2015, he was appointed as coach once again after Santiago Capurro resigned. Under his guidance, Las Leonas won the 2014–15 Hockey World League and 2016 Hockey Champions Trophy.

References

External links
 

1967 births
Living people
Argentine male field hockey players
Argentine field hockey coaches
Field hockey players at the 1988 Summer Olympics
Field hockey players at the 1992 Summer Olympics
Field hockey players at the 1996 Summer Olympics
Olympic field hockey players of Argentina
Pan American Games medalists in field hockey
Pan American Games gold medalists for Argentina
Pan American Games silver medalists for Argentina
Field hockey players at the 1987 Pan American Games
Field hockey players at the 1991 Pan American Games
Field hockey players at the 1995 Pan American Games
1990 Men's Hockey World Cup players
Medalists at the 1995 Pan American Games
Medalists at the 1987 Pan American Games
Medalists at the 1991 Pan American Games
Medalists at the 2007 Pan American Games